Kenneth Darby (born December 26, 1982 in Huntsville, Alabama) is a former American football running back. He was originally drafted by the Tampa Bay Buccaneers in the seventh round of the 2007 NFL Draft.  Darby has been a member of the Atlanta Falcons and St. Louis Rams.  He played college football at Alabama.

Early years
Darby attended S. R. Butler High School in Huntsville, Alabama. He rushed for 4,674 yards during his prep career and amassed 1,591 yards and 20 touchdowns as a senior, when he also had 2,367 all-purpose yards and scored 24 times. As an outside linebacker, he recorded 77 tackles his final campaign, giving him 281 tackles in his career.

College career
Kenneth Darby played his college ball at the University of Alabama. In 2002, he redshirted as a freshman. He first saw action his freshman year in 2003 under former coach Mike Shula. He played sparingly behind former running backs Shaud Williams and Ray Hudson.  He had 185 yards on 34 carries (5.4 avg.) and also caught three passes in the 10 games he played (one start).

With the graduation of Shaud Williams and starter Ray Hudson falling to injury, Darby saw extensive action in 2004. Taking over the starting running back job five games into the season, Darby rushed for over 1,100 yards. Due an injury at the end of the season, Darby was unable to play in the Music City Bowl. The Tide finished with a 6-6 record. Darby was a Second-team All-SEC selection after playing 12 games with five starts. He logged 219 carries for 1,062 yards (4.8 avg.) and a career-high
eight touchdowns and had 15 receptions for 74 yards (4.9
avg.) and one score.

Darby entered 2005 as a preseason All-SEC player and finished the season as one of the top running backs in the SEC. That year, the Crimson Tide finished 10-2 with a victory over Texas Tech in the Cotton Bowl Classic. He was a First-team All-SEC after starting all 12 games, with 239 carries for a career-high 1,242 yards (5.2 avg.) and three touchdowns and had 29 catches for 132 yards (4.6 avg.).

Darby entered his senior season needing just over 1,000 yards rushing to surpass Shaun Alexander as Alabama's career rushing leader. He rushed for over 800 yards and finished the season without a rushing touchdown. The Crimson Tide finished 6-6 with a loss to Oklahoma State in the Independence Bowl. In 2006 Darby was a Second-team All-SEC selection by The NFL Draft Report. He started all 13 games carrying 210 times for 835 yards (4.0 avg.) and caught 23 passes for 130 yards (5.7 avg.) and one score. After the season, Darby was selected to play in the Senior Bowl.

Professional career

Pre-draft

Tampa Bay Buccaneers

Ken Darby was selected by the Tampa Bay Buccaneers in the seventh round. He was waived by the Buccaneers during final cuts on August 30, 2008.

Atlanta Falcons
On September 1, 2008, Darby was signed to the practice squad of the Atlanta Falcons. He remained there the first six weeks of the season.

St. Louis Rams
Darby was signed to the St. Louis Rams' active roster from the Falcons' practice squad on October 14, 2008, after running back Brian Leonard was placed on injured reserve. Darby was also named the starter for the Rams' week 10 game with Steven Jackson being out for the game. During a game against the San Francisco 49ers, Darby caught a pass and was struck by Umpire Garth DeFelice who was trying to protect himself. Darby ended the 2008 NFL season with 32 carries for 140 yards (4.4 average) and 19 receptions for 183 yards (9.6) average and one touchdown.

References

External links
St. Louis Rams bio
Tampa Bay Buccaneers bio

Living people
1982 births
Sportspeople from Huntsville, Alabama
American football running backs
Alabama Crimson Tide football players
Tampa Bay Buccaneers players
Atlanta Falcons players
St. Louis Rams players